Chongshan Temple, may refer to:

 Chongshan Temple (Shanxi), in Taiyuan, Shanxi, China
 Chongshan Temple (Jiangsu), in Yixing, Jiangsu, China